Keerthi Sagathia (born 14 September 1979, in Mumbai) is a musician and singer. Keerthi is the son of famous Gujarati folk singer Karsan Sagathiya. In 2005 he was a contestant for Sony TV reality show Fame Gurukul. He was a celebrity guest singer on X Factor, Episode 29, first aired on 20 August 2011.

Playback singing

Albums
 ARRK – Sufi Rock

Awards and nominations
Along with Mustafa Kutoane, Sagathia received the Uninor Radio Mirchi Award in 2010, for Upcoming Playback Singer Male for Beera Beera (Raavan).

References
https://www.youtube.com/watch?v=QSZWYlIP74w

External links
 Official website

1979 births
Living people
Musicians articles needing expert attention
Indian male singers